Yvan Alounga (born 5 February 2002) is a Swiss professional footballer who plays as a forward for Stade Lausanne Ouchy on loan from FC Luzern.

Club career
On 22 January 2022, Alounga joined Swiss Challenge League side Schaffhausen on loan until the end of the season.

References

External links

2002 births
People from Ebolowa
Swiss people of Cameroonian descent
Cameroonian emigrants to Switzerland
Living people
Swiss men's footballers
Switzerland youth international footballers
Association football forwards
FC Luzern players
FC Aarau players
FC Schaffhausen players
FC Stade Lausanne Ouchy players
Swiss Super League players
Swiss Challenge League players
Swiss 1. Liga (football) players